Quarry Siding railway station is a small railway station in Sundergarh district, Odisha. Its code is QRS. It serves Rourkela city as a secondary station. The station consists of two platforms. The platforms are not well sheltered. It lacks many facilities including water and sanitation. The station just 9 km from Rourkela city.

Major trains 
 Birmitrapur Barsuan Passenger

References

Railway stations in Sundergarh district
Chakradharpur railway division
Rourkela
Transport in Rourkela